Pickering High School is a Canadian high school located in Ajax, Ontario, within the Durham District School Board serving the west Ajax and east Pickering area. Specifically, the school is found in historical Pickering Village, Ontario on Church Street. The school has students in grades 9 to 12, and offers gifted, co-op, and special education classes. Some gifted classes include: English, Science, Geography, History, and Mathematics.

History 
During the 1960s, Pickering High School was home to its famous rifle club.

In August 2008, Pickering High School completed a 21-million-dollar renovation project.

Rankings
Pickering High School was ranked 222nd of 740 schools in a study of Ontario high schools in 2015/2016. It obtained an overall score of 7/10 in 2016, up from 6.5 in 2012 and 5.2/10 in 2009. Scores are based on academic performance of students on grade 9 mathematics and the OSSLT. In 2012, Pickering HS rose in rank for the last three years, having been ranked 528th overall in 2009. The study was conducted by the Fraser Institute, which conducts studies on educational policy across Canada.

Notable alumni

Karena Evans, Actress, Director
Charlotte Arnold, actress
Boi-1da, Grammy Award-winning hip hop producer
Munro Chambers, actor
Closet Monster, rock band
Jesse Colburn, guitarist
Sara Ghulam, Miss World Canada 2007
Glenn Healy, former NHL player and commentator
Sara Kaljuvee, Olympic bronze medalist for Rugby Sevens
Cory Joseph, NBA champion, and point guard for the Detroit Pistons
Devoe Joseph, professional basketball player
Nichelle Prince, Canadian women's soccer player
Mark Spicoluk, musician
T-Minus, Grammy nominated hip hop producer

Sports

Pickering High has many former professional and former Olympic athletes as coaches:
John Martini – a former CFL player 
Stan Tzogas – an Olympic wrestler and Canadian Olympic Coach 
Jens Kraemer – played for Hamburg SV

OFSAA champions
1965 Boys' Volleyball 
1986 Boys' Rugby 
1990 Boys' Rugby 
2005 Boys' Football (Golden Horseshoe Bowl) 
2007 Boys' Basketball 
2008 Boys' Basketball 
2013 Girls' Soccer 
2017 Girls' Wrestling

Provincial track and field titles – OFSAA champions

1987 Junior  Boys
1991 Overall Boys
1992 Senior  Boys
1997 Overall Boys
1998 Midget Boys
1998 Ovelol
2002 Midget Boys 
2002 Overall Boys
2003 Junior  Boys
2007 Midget Girls
2007 Overall Combined Co-Ed
2007 Overall Girls
2008 Midget Boys
2009 Junior Boys
2009 Overall Boys
2009 Overall Combined Co-Ed
2009 Overall Girls
2010 Overall Boys
2010 Overall Combined Co-Ed
2010 Overall Girls

News Stories
In February 2009, the school was placed in lock down after a stabbing and ensuing motor vehicle accident occurred several blocks away, at a nearby park.

In February 2022, the school was placed in a Hold and Secure after one of its feeder schools, Alexander Graham Bell Public School, had reported an armed suspect connected to a local drug store robbery.

Feeder schools
Located in Ajax, Ontario
Alexander Graham Bell Public School
Cadarakque Public School
Eagle Ridge Public School 
Lincoln Alexander Public School
Lincoln Avenue Public School
Michaëlle Jean Public School
Roméo Dallaire Public School
Vimy Ridge Public School
Westney Heights Public School
Roland Michener Public School
Applecroft Public School
Located in Pickering, Ontario
Frenchman's Bay Public School 
William Dunbar Public School
High Castle Public School

See also
List of high schools in Ontario

References

External links
Pickering High School

High schools in the Regional Municipality of Durham
Ajax, Ontario
1951 establishments in Ontario
Educational institutions established in 1951